is a private university in Miyashiro, Saitama, Japan, established in 1967.

History
The Nippon Institute of Technology opened in 1907 as "Tokyo Engineering School". It was renamed "Tokyo Advanced Engineering School" in 1935, but was closed in 1943 due to World War II. In 1947, it reopened as "Toko Gakuen Junior High School" which became "Tokyo Industrial High School" in 1948 and the Nippon Institute of Technology in 1967.

At the time, it had departments of Mechanical Engineering, Electrical Engineering, and Architecture. A Department of Systems Engineering was added in 1975. In 1982, Nippon Institute of Technology established a graduate school offering master's degrees, followed by doctoral degrees from 1987. A Department of Computer and Information Engineering was established in 1995. The school marked its centennial in 2007.

See also
Colleges of technology in Japan

External links
Official website 

Educational institutions established in 1907
Private universities and colleges in Japan
Universities and colleges in Saitama Prefecture
Engineering universities and colleges in Japan
1907 establishments in Japan